Alexander Luttrell may refer to:

 Alexander Luttrell (died 1642), MP for Minehead 1640–42
 Alexander Luttrell (1663–1711), MP for Minehead 1690–1708
 Alexander Luttrell (1705–1737), MP for Minehead 1727–37

See also 
 Feudal barony of Dunster